Irina Kostyukhina (born 20 October 1981) is a Russian coxswain. She won a bronze medal with the mixed coxed four at the 2010 World Rowing Championships in the adaptive rowing category.

References

1981 births
Living people
Russian female rowers
Coxswains (rowing)
World Rowing Championships medalists for Russia